Onwe is a town in the Ejisu Municipal, a district in the Ashanti Region of Ghana.

References

Populated places in the Ashanti Region